Bernard Dunand (born 2 September 1936) is a Swiss competitive sailor and Olympic medalist. He won a silver medal in the 5.5 Metre class at the 1968 Summer Olympics in Mexico City, together with Marcel Stern and Louis Noverraz.

He sailed on France at the 1970 America's Cup.

References

External links
 

1936 births
Living people
Swiss male sailors (sport)
Sailors at the 1968 Summer Olympics – 5.5 Metre
Olympic sailors of Switzerland
Olympic silver medalists for Switzerland
Olympic medalists in sailing
Medalists at the 1968 Summer Olympics
1970 America's Cup sailors
Sportspeople from Geneva
20th-century Swiss people